Kolbu is a village in Østre Toten Municipality in Innlandet county, Norway. The village lies in the western part of the municipality in an agricultural area, not far from the municipal border with Vestre Toten. Kolbu Church is a cruciform church from 1730 that is located just outside the village centre.

History
Kolbu was the administrative centre of Kolbu Municipality which existed for 56 years (from 1908 when it was split off from Vestre Toten until 1964 when it was merged into Østre Toten).

Name
The village was named after the old Kolbu farm since this is where the local church was built. The first element of the name Kol- means "coal" and the last element bú means "house" or "dwelling". The first element is referring to the practice of making coal by burning wood.

Schools
In 2008, the Smeby, Lund, and Moen primary schools merged to form the new Kolbu School (Kolbu Skole). Students graduating from this school usually have to continue their education in Lena upper secondary school.

References

Østre Toten
Villages in Innlandet